A wildflower (or wild flower) is a flower that grows in the wild, meaning it was not intentionally seeded or planted. The term implies that the plant is neither a hybrid nor a selected cultivar that is any different from the native plant, even if it is growing where it would not naturally be found. The term can refer to the whole plant, even when not in bloom, and not just the flower.

"Wildflower" is an imprecise term. More exact terms include:
native species naturally occurring in the area (see flora)
exotic or introduced species not native to the area, including
invasive species that out-compete other plants, whether native or not
imported (introduced to an area whether deliberately or accidentally)
naturalized are imported but come to be considered by the public as native

In the United Kingdom, the organization Plantlife International instituted the "County Flowers scheme" in 2002, see County flowers of the United Kingdom for which members of the public nominated and voted for a wildflower emblem for their county. The aim was to spread awareness of the heritage of native species and about the need for conservation, as some of these species are endangered. For example, Somerset has adopted the cheddar pink (Dianthus gratianopolitanus), London the rosebay willowherb (Chamerion angustifolium) and Denbighshire/Sir Ddinbych in Wales the rare limestone woundwort (Stachys alpina).

Examples 

 Adonis aestivalis, summer pheasant's-eye
 Anagallis, pimpernel
 Agrostemma githago, common corn-cockle
 Alnus glutinosa, common alder
 Anthemis arvensis, corn chamomile
 Callirhoe involucrata, purple poppy-mallow
 Centaurea cyanus, cornflower
 Coreopsis tinctoria, plains coreopsis
 Dianthus barbatus, sweet William
 Digitalis purpurea, foxglove
 Dimorphotheca aurantiaca, glandular Cape marigold
 Eschscholzia californica, California poppy
Ficaria verna, lesser celandine
 Glebionis segetum, corn marigold
 Gypsophila elegans, annual baby's-breath
 Lantana spp., shrub verbenas
 Papaver rhoeas, common poppy
 Petasites hybridus, butterbur
 Phlox drummondii, annual phlox
 Potentilla sterilis, strawberryleaf cinquefoil
 Prunus padus, bird cherry
 Silene latifolia, white campion
 Tussilago farfara, coltsfoot
 Ulmus sp., elm
 Viola riviniana, common dog-violet
 Viola tricolor'', wild pansy

See also 
List of San Francisco Bay Area wildflowers
Superbloom
Megaherb
Native plant
Naturalisation

References

External links 

Wildflower Magazine promotes the use and conservation of wildflowers and native plants, Lady Bird Johnson Wildflower Center. Formerly published by the North American Native Plant Society
Plantlife, UK organization
Wildflower in Cyprus Information on 1250 native plant species to North Cyprus.
Ontario Wildflowers Detailed information about wildflowers of Ontario (Canada) and Northeastern North America
Western USA wildflower reports
NPIN: Native Plant Database
Native Plant Database from the North American Native Plant Society

Plants
Flowers